Macaguaje is an extinct Tucanoan language of Colombia.

References

Languages of Colombia
Tucanoan languages